Dedino may refer to:
 Dedino, Kardzhali Province, Bulgaria
 Dedino, North Macedonia